Viret is a surname. Notable people with the surname include:

 Brandon Viret (born 1988), South African cricketer
 Frédéric Viret (1822–1898), French organist
 Jacques Viret (born 1943), French musicologist of Swiss origin
 Pierre Viret (1511–1571), Swiss theologian

See also
 Virat